Kampong Pengiran Siraja Muda Delima Satu is a village in Brunei-Muara District, Brunei, and a neighbourhood in the capital Bandar Seri Begawan. The population was 2,354 in 2016. It is one of the villages within Mukim Berakas 'A'. The postcode is BB5113.

Name 
Pengiran Siraja Muda Delima Satu (or Delima Satu Pengiran Siraja Muda) is the primary name for this neighbourhood. It is composed from the merger of two names, 'Pengiran Siraja Muda' and 'Delima Satu'. However, the shorter two names are still commonly used to refer to the place.

'Pengiran Siraja Muda' is named after the initial residents which emigrated from Bakut Pengiran Siraja Muda, a neighbourhood in the riverine settlement of Kampong Ayer. Meanwhile, 'Delima Satu' comes from the Malay term which translates as 'Delima One' and means area one of Delima settlement. The settlement area, which also included Pancha Delima, is named after  or pomegranate that had been grown in the backyard of Awang Sugut bin Mahat's home, who eventually became the first village head for the settlement.

History 
The residents that had resettled in the area originally came from Bakut Pengiran Siraja Muda neighbourhood in Kampong Ayer (hence the name 'Pengiran Siraja Muda'); each family was given a  piece of land as the incentive to built a new home and also develop agriculturally as new means to sustain livelihood.

Administration 
In 2007, the village has also been incorporated as part of the expanded Bandar Seri Begawan municipal area, hence becomes a neighbourhood of the capital.

See also 
 Pancha Delima
 List of neighbourhoods in Bandar Seri Begawan

References 

Neighbourhoods in Bandar Seri Begawan
Villages in Brunei-Muara District
Public housing estates in Brunei